The Mesa Grande Band of Diegueño Mission Indians of the Mesa Grande Reservation is a federally recognized tribe of Kumeyaay Indians, who are sometimes known as Mission Indians.

Reservation
The Mesa Grande Reservation is a federal Indian reservation located in eastern San Diego County, California, near Santa Ysabel. Founded in 1875, the reservation is  large. Approximately 180 of the 630 members of the tribe live on the reservation. In 1973, 24 out of 261 enrolled tribal members lived on the reservation.

The reservation was featured in the 1936 film Ramona.

Government
The Mesa Grande Band is headquartered in Mesa Grande, CA. They are governed by a democratically elected tribal council. Michael Linton is their current tribal chairperson.

Notes

References
 Eargle, Jr., Dolan H. California Indian Country: The Land and the People. San Francisco: Tree Company Press, 1992. .
 Pritzker, Barry M. A Native American Encyclopedia: History, Culture, and Peoples. Oxford: Oxford University Press, 2000. .
 Shipek, Florence C. "History of Southern California Mission Indians." Handbook of North American Indians. Volume ed. Heizer, Robert F. Washington, DC: Smithsonian Institution, 1978. 610-618. .

External links
Mesa Grande Band of Mission Indians, Southern California Tribal Chairman's Association
Mesa Grande Band of Mission Indians, Mesa Grande Band of Mission Indians Official Tribal Government Website

Kumeyaay
California Mission Indians
Native American tribes in San Diego County, California
Native American tribes in California
Federally recognized tribes in the United States